Rediscovered Masters is a 1977 double LP by jazz pianist Red Garland releasing previously unissued recordings from sessions held between 1958 and 1961, which was issued by the Prestige label. It was later reissued on two CDs featuring one bonus track. 2 more tracks with the Richard Williams Oliver Nelson quintet can be found on the Soul Burnin' album

Track listing 
"Lover" - 5:14
"Five O'Clock Whistle" - 5:13
"Blues in Mambo" - 7:24
"A Ticket, a Tasket" - 7:07
"Estrellita" - 6:58
"It Might As Well Be Spring" - 8:41
"East of the Sun" - 9:14
"Blues in the Closet" - 5:37
"Blue Velvet" - 5:50
"Mr. Wonderful" - 9:55
"Satin Doll" - 9:48 Bonus track on CD reissue
"Skinny's Blues" - 8:09
"Soft Winds" - 6:14
"Avalon" - 6:24

Personnel 
Tracks 1-7
 Red Garland - piano
 Paul Chambers - bass
 Art Taylor - drums
 Ray Barretto - congas

Tracks 8-11
 Red Garland - piano
 Doug Watkins - double bass
 Specs Wright - drums

Tracks 12-14
 Red Garland - piano
 Oliver Nelson - tenor sax, alto sax
 Richard Williams - trumpet
 Peck Morrison - double bass
 Charlie Persip - drums

References 

1977 albums
Albums produced by Esmond Edwards
Prestige Records albums
Red Garland albums
Albums produced by Bob Weinstock